Inositol monophosphatase 2 is a 32 kDa enzyme that in humans is encoded by the IMPA2 gene. IMPA2 dephosphorylates myo-inositol monophosphate to myo-inositol.

The function of IMPA2 appears to be similar to IMPA1 within tissues; however, the genes are expressed differently in various tissues with IMPA2 expressed at the highest level in certain tissues of the brain and the lumen of the kidney. IMPA2 exists as a homodimer within cells and cannot form heterodimers with IMPA1.

References

Further reading

External links 
 

Biology of bipolar disorder
EC 3.1.3